Leonhard Kleber (c. 1495 – March 4, 1556) was a German organist, and probably composer, of the Renaissance.

He was born in Göppingen.  He graduated from Heidelberg University in 1512, and was probably a pupil of the famous blind organist and composer Arnolt Schlick around that time.  He is known to have held three positions after his graduation:  at Horb am Neckar, as organist and vicar-choral, in 1516 and 1517; at Esslingen am Neckar as organist until 1521; and at Pforzheim from 1521 on, where he was organist at the collegiate and parish church.  During this period he had numerous organ students, and was evidently renowned as a teacher.  He died at Pforzheim.

In 1524 Kleber produced his most famous work, a huge tablature containing 112 separate compositions, mostly by other composers.  It was compiled between 1521 and 1524, and contains 332 pages; several hands are identifiable in the manuscript, though none have been identified. None of the music is attributed to its composer, although most has been identified; some of the anonymous pieces may be by Kleber himself. Composers represented in the tablature include Paul Hofhaimer, Hayne van Ghizeghem, Heinrich Isaac, Josquin des Prez, Jacob Obrecht, Antoine Brumel, Heinrich Finck, Ludwig Senfl, Hans Buchner, as well as others.  Many  of the compositions were originally written for voices, especially those by the Franco-Flemish composers (for example Josquin, Isaac, Obrecht, Brumel); some of the music by German organists, such as Paul Hofhaimer and Buchner, was probably written for organ, and hence is contained in the tablature in its original form.

This huge early Reformation-era collection is one of the earliest large collections of organ music, and is unusual both for its size and inclusiveness, containing both sacred and secular music in arrangement.

References
Manfred Schuler: "Leonhard Kleber", Grove Music Online, ed. L. Macy (Accessed March 31, 2006), (subscription access)
Gustave Reese, Music in the Renaissance.  New York, W.W. Norton & Co., 1954.

External links

1490s births
1556 deaths
People from Göppingen
German classical organists
German male organists
Renaissance composers
Male classical composers
Male classical organists